Konus Island is an island in Shelikhov Bay, Sea of Okhotsk.

Geography
Konus Island is 1.3 km long and 0.7 km wide. It is located off the eastern coast of Penzhina Bay, separated from the continental shore by a 3 km-wide sound. Administratively, it belongs to the Kamchatka Krai. Ivyinichaman Island (Ивиньичаман) is located 7 km to the southwest.

History

American whaleships cruised for bowhead whales off the island from 1860 to 1889. They called it Shag Rock. Ships also anchored off the island to get coal and to trade with the natives for deer, fish, and berries.

References

Islands of the Sea of Okhotsk
Islands of the Russian Far East
Uninhabited islands of Russia